The fourth and final season of Vietnam got talent starting on 1 January 2016 and finished on 13 May 2016. The winner was drummer Nguyễn Trọng Nhân.

Semifinalist summary
7 Acts perform each week, 2 acts will make it through to the final.

Semi-final rounds

The acts are listed of chronological appearance.

Semi-final 1
11/3/2016
Guest: Hari Won

Semi Final 2
Date 18/3/2016
Guest Huyền Trang

Semi Final 3
Date 25/3/2016
Guest Võ Hạ Trâm

Semi Final 4
Date 1/4/2016
Guest Trang Pháp

Semi Final 5
Date 8/4/2016
Guest Hoàng Quyên

Semi Final 6
Date 15/4/2016
Guest Don Nguyễn

Semi Final 7
Date 22/4/2016
Guest (Băng Di, BB Trần, Huỳnh Mến), Hoàng Yến Chibi

Wild cards

Final Rounds Part 1

Final Rounds Part 2

Grand Final

Vietnam's Got Talent
2016 Vietnamese television seasons